Glaucocharis clytia is a moth in the family Crambidae. It was described by Stanisław Błeszyński in 1966. It is found on Sumatra.

References

Diptychophorini
Moths described in 1966